Amata marina is a moth of the family Erebidae. It was described by Arthur Gardiner Butler in 1876. It is found in Cameroon, the Republic of the Congo, the Democratic Republic of the Congo, Equatorial Guinea, Gabon, Ghana, Sierra Leone, Uganda, Zambia and Zimbabwe.

References

 Arctiidae genus list at Butterflies and Moths of the World of the Natural History Museum

marina
Moths described in 1876
Moths of Africa